China Town is a 2011 Indian Malayalam-language action comedy film written and directed by the Rafi Mecartin duo and produced by Antony Perumbavoor under the company Aashirvad Cinemas. The film stars Mohanlal, Jayaram, Dileep and Suraj Venjaramoodu with Kavya Madhavan, Poonam Bajwa, Dipa Shah, Pradeep Rawat, Captain Raju and Shankar in pivotal roles. Jagathi Sreekumar makes a cameo appearance. Jassie Gift provided the film's music. The film is loosely based on The Hangover.

The plot follows Mathukutty, Zachariah, and Binoy from Kerala, who reached Chinatown in Goa to claim the ownership of their family’s Casino but inadvertently there they get embroiled with local mafia and drug dealers. The film was released on 14 April 2011 in India. Despite receiving mixed reviews from critics, the film was a blockbuster at the box office.

Plot

Four friends, Xavier, Wilson Gomez, Jayakrishnan and David bought a casino and were celebrating the profit with their family when a powerful politician, Gowda , who used to have a monopoly on the casinos in Goa, intrudes. Xavier held out against the don. Although he was killed, he managed to hold off the gang long enough for all of their wives to escape with the children. Wilson Gomez is the only of the friends to survive and he settled in Goa with his daughter, Emily.
         
Xavier's son, Mathukutty  became a local don. His brother had eloped with a girl from the medical college and he lives with Rosamma. He was attending a retreat to get rid of his thuggish ways. Another son of one of the friends was Zachariah, a man thirsty for money. Another was Binoy a lovesick youth who was the victim of six failed loves. Gomez sends each of them a letter stating that he had bought a Casino and wanted to share the profit between the sons of his friends.

The three meet Gowda, who is now a minister in Goa, who places them in prison under a false case. They get out by selling their casino. They meet again on several occasions and finally Gowda is arrested.

Cast

Production
In August 2010, it was reported that Mohanlal, Jayaram, and Dileep will come together with Suraj Venjaramoodu in a film titled China Town to be directed by the Rafi Mecartin duo and produced by Antony Perumbavoor for the company Aashirvad Cinemas. The duo themselves wrote the screenplay, which was initially meant for Mohanlal alone, but as the plot developed it required two more actors in the lead roles and Dileep and Jayaram was approached. China Town began production on 20 December 2010. Filming began in Ooty, Tamil Nadu. Principal photography took place mainly at the Ramoji Film City, Hyderabad. The set was made by art director Boban. Some parts were filmed in Goa and Ernakulam.

Reception

Critical reception
Veeyen of Nowrunning.com rated the film 2/5 and said "Despite the spectacular star cast Chinatown, is yet another comedy from Rafi Mecartin. It's a mishmash of second hand ideas that have long had their run in movies." Paresh C. Pallicha of Rediff also gave the film a 2/5 rating and said, "The film virtually piggybacks on the stars to get the momentum as there is no script to speak of. The duo Rafi Mecartin that was known for their comical writing in the nineties has now reached a stage where they borrow dialogues from email forwards. That's the sorry state of the film. It will be futile to dwell on the performance of the actors as there is no solid material to back them. This one's a no-brainer and can be watched if you are not looking for thought-provoking stuff."  The reviewer of Sify said, "Chinatown works fine, if you leave your brains back home. It belongs to the 'don't think too much about what is happening' kind, which defies logic but leaves you in splits at times.". The New Indian Express wrote that "The movie has a good sense of pacing in the first half, but fails to up the ante" and that Mohanlal is "quite impressive", Jayaram is okay, Dileep with his comedy numbers, is "the live element in the movie", and concluded that "Overall, Chinatown, which could have been a lot more, in absence of genuineness, ends up being a 'fan' carnival than a fun carnival".

Box office
The film which had 500 shows per day, covered its production cost in just two weeks run. And grossed  within one month. The Economic Times called it a "blockbuster film".

Soundtrack

The film's music was then composed by Jassie Gift. The lyrics were by Anil Panachooran and Santhosh Varma. The audio release function was held at Kadavu Resorts, Kozhikode, on 2 March 2011. Jassie reused his tune "Gaganave Baagi" from the Kannada film Sanju Weds Geetha for the song "Arike Ninnalum".

References

External links

Indian comedy thriller films
2011 films
2010s Malayalam-language films
Indian black comedy films
Films scored by Jassie Gift
Aashirvad Cinemas films
Films shot at Ramoji Film City
Films shot in Telangana
Films shot in Goa
Films shot in Kochi
Films directed by Rafi–Mecartin